Grease Monkey International, Inc. is an independent American franchisor of automotive service centers offering oil changes, preventive maintenance, and other car care services.

Overview 
Founded in 1978, and headquartered in Denver, Grease Monkey International, Inc. currently has more than 500 centers operating in the United States, Latin America and China.

History 
Initially, Grease Monkey International, Inc. operated as a subsidiary of Grease Monkey Holding Corporation.  On December 31, 2013, Grease Monkey Holding Corporation was merged into Grease Monkey International, with Grease Monkey International being the surviving corporation.

In September 2013 Grease Monkey announced it acquired the assets and franchise contracts of LubePro's International, a 30-store chain of fast lubrication and automotive maintenance centers located in Illinois, Minnesota, Tennessee and Wisconsin.

Services 
Grease Monkey began offering an EcoPower full service oil change in 2007 at participating locations.  In April 2012, The National Oil & Lube News featured Grease Monkey franchisees Roger Bouchard and Champe Granger for their "Going Green" efforts. Celebrating one year of being green, Bouchard and Granger began the green initiatives as a way to give back to their community and provide customers with environmentally-conscious options to maintain their vehicles.

References

External links 
 Grease Monkey International

American companies established in 1978
Retail companies established in 1978
Automotive repair shops of the United States
Companies based in Denver